Jersey Bridge can refer to:

In the United States
 Jersey Bridge (Downieville, California), listed on the National Register of Historic Places (NRHP) in Sierra County
 Jersey Bridge (Cherrytree Township, Pennsylvania), listed on the NRHP in Venango County (as "Bridge in Cherrytree Township")